Akinci may refer to:

 Bayraktar Akıncı, Turkish military drone
 Akinji, irregular light cavalry of the Ottoman Empire